The 1916 American Grand Prize was a Grand Prix auto race that took place at Santa Monica, California, on November 18, 1916.

Summary
The race was included on the 1916 AAA National Championship Trail.  The race carried championship implications for Dario Resta and Johnny Aitken.  Aitken led Resta by 240 points before the Vanderbilt Cup, held two days before the Grand Prize, with a 150-mile event at Ascot Park two weeks after.  Resta won the Cup and earned 900 points, while Aitken was forced out on lap 19 with a broken valve.  Resta held a 660-point lead entering the Grand Prize, with 1000 available to the winner.  As World War I was waged in Europe, the cars were all American-entered, including two Peugeots entered by the Indianapolis Motor Speedway for Aitken and Howdy Wilcox.

Aitken's race ended on lap 1, with a broken piston, while Resta raced into the lead.  The IMS team attempted to flag Wilcox into the pits for Aitken to take over the car, but the AAA officials denied them the change.  By lap 9, Resta led from Ed Ruckstell's Mercer, the Stutz of Earl Cooper, and Eddie Rickenbacker's Duesenberg.  On lap 13, Lewis Jackson's Marmon went through a barrier, killing Jackson and three spectators.

On lap 16, Resta experienced a misfire, and retired soon after.  On lap 20, Aitken replaced Wilcox in an attempt to gain as many championship points as he could.  (The AAA, however, had set a precedent at Indianapolis by not awarding points to Eddie Rickenbacker in his relief drive.)  Aitken led the final 22 laps and took the victory, but Resta had all but secured the championship.

With the United States' entrance to World War I in April 1917, and board track racing taking the national spotlight, road racing in the U.S. became largely dormant.  Grand Prix racing did not return until 1936, and did not become a fixture until 1959.

Classification

References

United States Grand Prix
American Grand Prize
American Grand Prize
Grand Prize
1916 in sports in California
History of Santa Monica, California